The Normandie class consisted of five dreadnought battleships ordered for the French Navy in 1912–1913. The design incorporated a radical arrangement for the twelve 340 mm (13.4 in) main battery guns: three quadruple-gun turrets, the first of their kind, as opposed to the twin-gun turrets used by most other navies. The first four ships were also equipped with an unusual hybrid propulsion system that used both steam turbines and triple-expansion steam engines to increase fuel efficiency.

The ships were never completed due to shifting production requirements and a shortage of labor after the beginning of World War I in 1914. The first four ships were sufficiently advanced in construction to permit their launching to clear the slipways for other, more important work. Many of the guns built for the ships were converted for use by the Army. After the war, the French Navy considered several proposals to complete the ships, either as originally designed or modernized to account for lessons from the war. The weak French post-war economy forestalled these plans and the first four ships were broken up.

The last ship, Béarn, which was not significantly advanced at the time work halted, was converted into an aircraft carrier in the 1920s. She remained in service in various capacities until the 1960s and was ultimately scrapped in 1967.

Development 

In December 1911, the French Navy's Technical Committee issued a report that examined the design of the  that had been ordered for 1912. They concluded that the amidships gun turret was an unsatisfactory choice, based on previous experiences with blast damage on battleships from their own guns from the 1880s. This position influenced the construction of the next class of dreadnought battleships, for which design work began shortly thereafter.

The French Navy's design staff submitted the first draft of the new dreadnought design in February 1912. The size of French shipyard facilities significantly affected the design.

The design staff presented three alternatives, all armed with a secondary armament of twenty  guns in a new twin-gun casemate mounting. The first was a design with the same ten 340 mm guns as the Bretagnes, but with a top speed greater than 21 knots. The second was for a ship with a dozen 340 mm guns arranged in two quadruple-gun turrets fore and aft of the superstructure with superfiring twin-gun turrets and a speed of 20 knots. The last proposal was a ship that was armed with sixteen  guns in four quadruple turrets and a speed of 20 knots.

The staff also prepared two different designs for the propulsion system. Two sets of direct-drive steam turbines were proposed, as in the Bretagne class; the other option was a hybrid system that used one set of direct-drive turbines on the two inner propeller shafts, and two vertical triple-expansion steam engines (VTE) on the outer shafts for low-speed cruising. This was intended to reduce coal consumption at cruising speeds, as direct-drive turbines are very inefficient at moderate to low speeds. The fifth ship, Béarn, was instead equipped with two sets of turbines to allow her to match the fuel consumption rate of the turbine-equipped Bretagne class.

The General Staff decided in March 1912 to retain the 340 mm gun of the Bretagne class and favored the all-turbine design. They chose the new quadruple turret and preferred an armament of twelve guns in two quadruple and two double turrets. The following month, the Naval Supreme Council could not reach a decision on the quadruple turret as it was still being developed, but wished to revisit the issue once it was further along. The council rejected the twin-gun casemate mounting proposed for the secondary armament and proposed a mixture of eighteen 138.6 mm and a dozen  guns. It did accept the hybrid propulsion system and the armor layout of the Bretagne class was to be retained, though an increase in the thickness of the main belt was to be effected if possible. Théophile Delcassé, the Naval Minister, accepted the council's recommendations with the proviso that the Bretagne-class arrangement of five twin turrets, including one amidships, would be substituted if the quadruple turrets were not ready in time.

The Technical Department prepared two new designs, A7, which incorporated the five twin turrets, and A7bis, which was armed with three quadruple turrets. The A7bis design was some  lighter than the A7 design, and on 6 April, the Navy accepted a quadruple-gun-turret design submitted by Saint-Chamond. On 22 May it realized that the 100 mm gun would not ready by the time construction was scheduled to begin, so the design reverted to the 138.6 mm gun. Further work revealed that two additional guns could be accommodated and the Naval Supreme Council accepted the design with twenty-four 138.6 mm guns on 8 July.

Description 
The ships were subdivided by transverse bulkheads into 21 watertight compartments.

The first four ships were equipped with one set of steam turbines driving the inner pair of four-bladed,  propellers. Normandie and Flandre had license-built Parsons turbines, Gascogne had turbines by Rateau-Bretagne, and Languedocs turbines were built by Schneider-Zoelly. The four ships had a pair of four-cylinder vertical triple-expansion engines that drove the two outer three-bladed,  propellers for steaming astern or cruising at low speed. The last ship, Béarn, was equipped with two sets of Parsons turbines, each driving a pair of three-bladed, 3.34 m propellers. Normandie and Gascogne were fitted with 21 Guyot-du Temple-Normand small-tube boilers, Flandre and Languedoc were equipped with 28 Belleville large-tube boilers, while Béarn had 28 Niclausse boilers.

The ships would have had a crew of 44 officers and 1,160 enlisted men when serving as a flagship.

Armament 
The main battery of the Normandie class consisted of a dozen 45-caliber Canon de 340 mm Modèle 1912M guns mounted in three quadruple turrets. One turret was placed forward, one amidships, and one aft, all on the centerline. Each pair of guns had its own ammunition hoist and magazine. They could be fired simultaneously or independently. Had the ships been completed, these would have been the first quadruple turrets in the world.

Each gun was to have been supplied with 100 rounds of ammunition. Five  rangefinders provided fire-control for the main battery. Two of the rangefinders were mounted on the conning tower and the other three were placed atop each of the turrets. The turrets also had auxiliary gunnery-control stations.

The ships would also have been armed with a secondary battery of twenty-four 55-caliber 138.6 mm Modèle 1910 guns, each singly mounted in casemates near the main-gun turrets. The guns would have been supplied with 275 rounds of ammunition each. Six Canon de  Modèle 1902 anti-aircraft guns, which were converted from low-angle guns, would also have been carried by the ships. The ships also would have been equipped with six underwater  torpedo tubes, three on each broadside. Each ship was to be supplied with 36 torpedoes.

Protection

The armor belt of the Normandie-class ships was made from Krupp cemented armor and extended almost the entire length of the hull, save  at the stern. Aft of the rear turret, the armor plates were progressively reduced in thickness from 260 millimeters to 140 millimeters. The aft belt terminated in a  transverse bulkhead.

Above the waterline belt was an upper strake of 160-millimeter armor that extended between the fore and aft groups of casemates for the secondary armament. The turrets were protected with an armor thickness of 300 millimeters on their faces,  on the sides, and 100 millimeters on the roof. The lower armored deck consisted of a single  plate of mild steel for a width of  along the centerline and another layer of the same thickness was added outboard of that.

Their propulsion machinery spaces and magazines were protected by a torpedo bulkhead that consisted of two  layers of nickel-chrome steel plates. The outer side of the bulkhead was lined with a 10-millimeter plate of corrugated flexible steel intended to absorb the force of a torpedo detonation. Another measure intended to dissipate the force were  tubes that extended from the double bottom to the upper armored deck that were intended to divert the gases of the detonation away from the torpedo bulkhead. Concerned about the possibility of capsizing after asymmetric flooding, the design incorporated empty compartments below the waterline and outboard of the fore and aft 34-centimeter magazines, the engine rooms and the midships 138.6-millimeter magazines that were intended to be flooded to correct any list.

Ships

Construction and cancellation 

Named after provinces of France, Normandie and Languedoc were ordered on 18 April 1913, although neither was formally authorized until the enabling finance bill was passed on 30 July, and Flandre and Gascogne on that same day. Béarn had been planned to be ordered on 1 October 1914, but it was brought forward to 1 January; the five ships would permit the creation of two four-ship divisions with the three Bretagne-class dreadnoughts then under construction.

Work on the class was suspended at the outbreak of World War I, as all resources were needed for the Army. The mobilization in July greatly impeded construction as those workmen in the reserves were called up and work was effectively halted later that month. The labor force available to work on the Normandies was further reduced by conscription and orders for munitions for the Army. In light of such constraints, the navy decided that only those ships that could be completed quickly would be worked upon, like the Brétagnes, although construction of the first four Normandies was solely authorized to continue to clear the slipways for other purposes. Construction of Béarn had been already halted on 23 July and all further work on her was abandoned.

In July 1915 work on the ships' armament was suspended, save the guns themselves, which could be converted for use by the Army. Four of the completed 340 mm guns were converted into railway guns for the French Army. Nine of the guns built for Languedoc were also mounted on railway carriages in 1919, after the end of the war. Several of the 138.6 mm guns were also modified for service with the Army.

Progress when abandoned 

The boilers intended for Normandie and Gascogne were used to replace the worn-out boilers of various destroyers, namely the s purchased from Argentina in 1914 and the three Aetos-class ships seized from the Royal Hellenic Navy in late 1916. Those boilers built for Flandre were installed in new anti-submarine ships. The armor plate and turntables of Gascognes turrets had been ordered from Fives-Lille, whose factory was captured by the Germans in 1914. They were discovered in one of Krupp's factories in Germany in 1921 and returned to the Navy.

In January 1918, a final wartime order specified that the ships remained suspended, but that all material that had been stockpiled for work would remain in place.

On 22 November, days after the Armistice with Germany, the design staff sent the General Staff a proposal to complete the first four Normandies to a modified design. Since the dockyard facilities had not been enlarged during the war, the size of the ships could not be significantly increased. This allowed for only modest improvements, particularly for the installation of anti-torpedo bulges. In February 1919, the General Staff decided that the ships would be completed anyway, because new vessels incorporating the lessons of the war could not be completed for at least six to seven years, due to the lengthy design studies such battleships would require.

The Technical Department created a revised design that incorporated some improvements. The elevation of the main guns was to be increased to 23–24 degrees, which would increase the range of the guns to  lest they be out-ranged by foreign battleships. The need to engage targets at longer ranges was confirmed by the examination of one of the ex-Austrian  ships that had been surrendered to France at the end of the war. The submerged 450 mm torpedo tubes were to be replaced with deck-mounted  tubes, and fire-control equipment was to be improved. Equipment for handling a two-seat reconnaissance aircraft and a single-seat fighter was also to be installed.

After the war, Vice Admiral Pierre Ronarc'h became Chief of the General Staff, and in July 1919 he argued that the Italian Navy was the country's primary naval rival, and that they might resume work on the s that had been suspended during the war. He suggested there were three options for the first four Normandies: complete them as designed, increase the range of their guns and improve their armor, or lengthen their hull and install new engines to increase speed. Nevertheless, by 12 September 1919, Ronarc'h had decided that completing the ships would be too expensive for the fragile French economy. Plans for the first four ships included converting them into cargo ships, oil tankers, or passenger liners, and using them as floating oil depots, but these ideas were ultimately rejected. The ships were formally cancelled in the 1922 construction program, and were laid up in Landevennec and cannibalized for parts before being broken up in 1923–1926. Much of the salvaged material was incorporated into completing Béarn and in modernizing the battleship .

Plans to complete Béarn included replacement of the coal-fired boilers with eight oil-fired Niclausse boilers and new, more powerful turbines. A new quadruple turret that allowed for greater range was considered, along with twin turrets mounting  guns. The battleship was launched on 15 April 1920 to clear the slipway. A temporary  wooden platform was built atop the lower armored deck later that year to serve as a flight deck for aircraft landing trials. Transverse arresting wires that were weighted by sandbags were improvised and the evaluation successfully took place off Toulon in late 1920. In 1922, the Navy instead decided to complete the ship as an aircraft carrier. Conversion work began in August 1923, and was completed by May 1927 using the hybrid propulsion system from Normandie with a dozen Normand boilers. The ship was the first carrier of the French Navy. She served in the fleet through World War II, generally being used as a ferry for aircraft; she did not see any combat as she spent most of the war in the Caribbean in the island of Martinique. In 1944, she was refitted in the United States and equipped with a battery of modern American anti-aircraft guns. She remained in service through the First Indochina War, still as an aircraft ferry. The ship was ultimately broken up for scrap in 1967.

Notes

References

Further reading 

 

Battleship classes
 
Proposed ships
Ship classes of the French Navy